Juniata Terrace, a former company town, is a borough in Mifflin County, Pennsylvania, United States. The population was 567 at the 2020 census.

History
Construction of the town started in 1920 and was completed by 1924 by the British Crown Rayon Company, a rayon manufacturer later known as American Viscose Corporation, for the workers of its Lewistown plant. The plant was opened in 1921 and was located across the Juniata River from Lewistown, on the same side as Juniata Terrace.  It employed up to 5,000 workers and was closed in 1972 following flooding and damage from Tropical Storm Agnes. The town was constructed on a ridge overlooking the Juniata River to the east and the Lewistown Railroad Station to the north, about one and a half miles from downtown Lewistown.

Two hundred fifty nearly identical brick townhouses were built along three streets, each about 500 yards long, which were crossed by four shorter streets. Early renters were all company employees and paid $1 a month in rent out of the standard factory worker's 15-cents-an-hour pay. With solid brick construction, electricity, and running water, the apartments were luxurious for the time. Each home had three bedrooms and a bathroom on the top floor. A front porch, living room and a kitchen/dining room formed the ground floor. There was also a basement and a backyard.

There are few other buildings in the borough. Juniata Terrace School operated from the 1920s to  1976 when it was sold to the borough for $1. The Lewistown Christian and Missionary Alliance Church was constructed in the 1950s. One building housed the company grocery store and drugstore until it was converted into Wilson’s Meats and Grocery in 1965.

During the 1950s, American Viscose sold the homes to the tenants for $2,800. The borough was incorporated in 1967. Twenty-two houses were destroyed by a fire in 2014, but were rebuilt and are still standing.

Geography
Juniata Terrace is located at  (40.584795, −77.580160).

Demographics

As of the census of 2000, there were 502 people, 223 households, and 148 families residing in the borough. The population density was 3,939.8 people per square mile (1,490.9/km2). There were 233 housing units at an average density of 1,828.6 per square mile (692.0/km2). The racial makeup of the borough was 97.61% White, 1.39% African American, 0.20% Native American, and 0.80% from two or more races. Hispanic or Latino of any race were 0.40% of the population.

There were 223 households, out of which 28.3% had children under the age of 18 living with them, 49.8% were married couples living together, 12.6% had a female householder with no husband present, and 33.2% were non-families. 30.5% of all households were made up of individuals, and 17.0% had someone living alone who was 65 years of age or older. The average household size was 2.25 and the average family size was 2.77.

In the borough the population was spread out, with 23.3% under the age of 18, 5.8% from 18 to 24, 29.7% from 25 to 44, 20.1% from 45 to 64, and 21.1% who were 65 years of age or older. The median age was 39 years. For every 100 females there were 89.4 males. For every 100 females age 18 and over, there were 86.0 males.

The median income for a household in the borough was $29,286, and the median income for a family was $33,750. Males had a median income of $25,694 versus $18,864 for females. The per capita income for the borough was $14,398. About 2.6% of families and 7.8% of the population were below the poverty line, including 12.3% of those under age 18 and 4.5% of those age 65 or over.

References

External links
Official website

Boroughs in Mifflin County, Pennsylvania